Jacqueline Marguerite van Nie  (1897-1983) was a Dutch artist.

Biography
Van Nie was born on 6 April 1897 in Paris, France. She studied at the Rijksakademie van beeldende kunsten (State Academy of Fine Arts) in Amsterdam. Her teachers included , Carel Lodewijk Dake sr., Antoon Derkinderen, and Nicolaas van der Waay.  Her work was included in the 1939 exhibition and sale Onze Kunst van Heden (Our Art of Today) at the Rijksmuseum in Amsterdam.

Van Nie was married twice, first to H. van Nie in 1919, then to R.J.P. Muller in 1952. Van Nie died on 7 January 1983 in The Hague.

References

1897 births
1983 deaths
Artists from Paris
20th-century Dutch women artists
French emigrants to the Netherlands